The final of the Men's Discus Throw event at the 2003 Pan American Games took place on Friday August 8, 2003. Jason Tunks won the first discus gold for Canada in the history of the Pan American Games.

Medalists

Records

Results

See also
2003 World Championships in Athletics – Men's discus throw
Athletics at the 2004 Summer Olympics – Men's discus throw

References
Results

Discus, Men
2003